Gregory John Crafter  (born 16 September 1944) is a former South Australian Labor Party politician. He was the member for Norwood from 1979 to 1993, with a short break from September 1979 to February 1980.

Crafter was elected in a March 1979 by-election triggered by the abrupt resignation of Premier Don Dunstan, the member for Norwood since 1953.  Only six months later, however, he was turned out of office by Liberal Frank Webster as Labor lost government in the September 1979 state election.  When the Court of Disputed Returns overturned Webster's win, Crafter contested a February 1980 by-election for his old seat and won.  He held the seat until his defeat in 1993.

Crafter held a number of ministerial positions under John Bannon and Lynn Arnold, including Minister for Local Government.

After his parliamentary career, Crafter worked as a registered political lobbyist in South Australia, acting as Greg Crafter Consulting. He also served as National Catholic Education Commission chairman.

References

1944 births
Living people
Members of the South Australian House of Assembly
Officers of the Order of Australia
Australian Labor Party members of the Parliament of South Australia